Jerry Lafaele Scanlan (January 4, 1957 – July 8, 2015), nicknamed "The Snake", was a former American football tight end in the National Football League for the Washington Redskins.  He played college football at the University of Hawaii.

References

1957 births
2015 deaths
Players of American football from Honolulu
American football offensive tackles
Hawaii Rainbow Warriors football players
Washington Redskins players